Nari Munidare Mari is a 1972 Indian Kannada-language film, directed by Geethapriya and produced by M. P. Shankar. The film stars Kalpana, Udaykumar, Narasimharaju and B. Jaya. The film has musical score by Rajan–Nagendra.

Cast

Kalpana as Hema
Srinath as Hema's husband (cameo)
Udaykumar
Narasimharaju
B. Jaya as Malli
Indrani
Baby Shyam
M. P. Shankar
Rajanand
Prabhakar
Zaviar
Mylara Shetty
D. Pani
M. J. Hosur
Cheluvaraj
Azeej
H. R. Krishna
Malur Sonnappa
M. P. Ramasingh
M. N. Rudrappa
Hemalatha
Sampath (cameo)
Thoogudeepa Srinivas (cameo)
M. Jayashree (cameo)
Jayakumari

Soundtrack
The music was composed by Rajan–Nagendra.

References

External links
 
 

1972 films
1970s Kannada-language films
Films scored by Rajan–Nagendra
Films directed by Geethapriya